Charles Dussuet is a Swiss retired slalom canoeist who competed from the late 1940s to the early 1960s. He won nine medals at the ICF Canoe Slalom World Championships with three golds (C-1: 1951, 1953; C-2: 1953), three silvers (C-1 team: 1953; C-2 team: 1953, 1957) and three bronzes (C-2 team: 1951, 1959, 1961).

References
ICF medalists for Olympic and World Championships - Part 2: rest of flatwater (now sprint) and remaining canoeing disciplines: 1936-2007.

Possibly living people
Swiss male canoeists
Year of birth missing (living people)
Medalists at the ICF Canoe Slalom World Championships